Bushy Park Homestead is an Edwardian-era homestead registered as a Category I heritage building by Heritage New Zealand. It is located in Bushy Park, at 791 Rangitatau East Road,  from Kai Iwi, Whanganui, in the Manawatū-Whanganui region.

Built by Russell and Bignell in 1906 at a cost of £4,566 for G. Frank Moore, a cattle and racehorse breeder, the residence and park were given to the Royal Forest and Bird Protection Society of New Zealand by Moore in 1962. The homestead, bird sanctuary, and rain forest have been managed by Bushy Park Homestead and Forest Trust since 1994.

Bushy Park Homestead was registered by Heritage New Zealand, then called New Zealand Historic Places Trust, on 22 November 1984 as a Category I historic place. It was recognised for being designed by one of New Zealand's foremost architects, and for its association with the Royal Forest and Bird Protection Society of New Zealand.

References

Heritage New Zealand Category 1 historic places in Manawatū-Whanganui
Whanganui District
1906 establishments in New Zealand
Houses in New Zealand
1900s architecture in New Zealand